Kremstal is an Austrian wine region. Downstream of the Wachau, it is centred on the town of Krems. The  climate is a little warmer because the valley opens out a little, allowing more red wine to be produced, but otherwise Kremstal is quite similar to the Wachau.

References

Wine regions of Austria